The Lady in White, also known as The Woman in White, is an 1880 oil-on-canvas painting by French artist Marie Bracquemond. It depicts a portrait of the artist's half-sister Louise Quivoron, who often served as a model for her paintings.  It was one of three paintings of hers shown at the fifth Impressionist exhibition in April 1880.  A previous painting, Woman in the Garden (1877), may have been a study for The Lady in White. It appears on a large canvas with subdued colors reminiscent of Jean-Baptiste-Camille Corot (1796–1875). Like the other Impressionists of the time, Bracquemond worked outside en plein air, mostly in her garden at Sèvres.

Background
Marie Bracquemond (1840–1916) was a French artist who began painting in the 1850s.  Unlike many of her contemporaries, she came from a working class background and was mostly self-taught. She was initially influenced by Romanticism which was in vogue at the time, and began by painting little medieval scenes, such as people reading (Reading) and portraits (Cervantes in Prison).  Her interest in medieval art was likely influenced by her childhood near Ussel in proximity of the ancient abbey Notre-Dame de Bonnaigue.  Her style changed as she received training from Jean-Auguste-Dominique Ingres (1780–1867); his personality and harsh limits for women artists drove her away, but the influence of formalism from Ingres and his students would remain, showing up in her early works like Portrait of the Mother, Aline Pasquiou-Quivoron (1860), which shows aspects of Rembrandt (1606–1669).  The lasting influence of Ingres would later spread to her personal life.

While painting at the Louvre in 1866, Marie met her husband Félix Bracquemond, later marrying him in 1869. Félix had studied under Joseph Guichard (1806–1880), a student of Ingres. By the 1870s, Marie's work had hints of Realism (The Backgammon Players) reflecting her appreciation of painters like Alfred Stevens (1823–1906). Félix would later exhibit with the first Impressionist exhibition in 1874, with the two of them both submitting works to the fourth exhibition in 1879. During the late 1870s, the influence of the then nascent Impressionists began to make its mark on Marie, as artists like Edgar Degas (1834–1917), Claude Monet (1840–1926), and Pierre-Auguste Renoir (1841–1919) came into her orbit of influence, respect, and admiration. 

Marie submitted three paintings to the fifth Impressionist exhibition from April 1-30, 1880, at 10 rue des Pyramides, one of which was believed to have been The Lady in White submitted under the title Portrait, cat. no. 85. At that exhibition, her paintings were shown alongside works by her husband as well as Gustave Caillebotte (1848–1894), Degas, Jean-Louis Forain (1852–1931), Paul Gauguin (1848–1903), Armand Guillaumin (1842–1927), Albert Lebourg (1849–1928), Léopold Levert (1819–1882), Camille Pissarro (1830–1903), Jean-François Raffaëlli (1850–1924), Henri Rouart (1833-1912), Charles Tillot (1825–1895), Eugène Vincent Vidal (1850–1908), Victor Vignon (1847–1909), and Federico Zandomeneghi (1841–1917).

Description
At 180.5 cm × 105 cm (71.1 in × 41 in), this life-size painting depicts a woman in a white dress sitting in a garden.  It is signed "Marie B." in the lower right corner. Bracquemond's half-sister, Louise Quiveron, served as a model for her paintings due to the limited options available to women artists in 19th century France, whose freedom to study art was greatly curtailed.  As a common subject for the Impressionists, painting a figure in a garden also gave women artists like Bracquemond the ability to paint en plein air at home in her garden at Sèvres due to the cultural restrictions on women artists painting alone outside.

Most women artists at the time were forced by convention to work in the studio, and were discouraged from working outside the studio by themselves; this limited their artistic repertoire, focus, and range of subjects. It was for this very reason that Bracquemond had earlier abandoned her original study regimen with Ingres, as he wished to confine her in the studio to only painting "flowers, fruits, still lifes, portraits and genre scenes"—subjects and styles Ingres believed were suitable for women.

The painting may have been made en plein air, but the composition was given careful thought, as a number of drawings were made beforehand as a study.  Pierre, Bracquemond's son, described how his mother was obsessed with and studied the color white as it changed in the outdoor sunlight, a common problem for the Impressionists. According to Pierre, the painting was the last one his mother made in the "classical technique", indicating as art historian Tamar Garb describes it, that it was a transitional work from the influence of Jean-Baptiste-Camille Corot (1796–1875) and the Naturalists to Bracquemond's subsequent Impressionistic style of choice. The painting would later make another appearance in another work, this time in the background of Bracquemond’s watercolor Interior of a Salon.

Reception
French art critics praised the work during its initial viewing at the fifth Impressionist exhibition. Arthur d'Echerac called it a "masterful debut", while Gustave Goetschy said that Bracquemond "paints ravishingly". Philippe Burty noted that the work was the culmination of "serious study", while Paul Armand Silvestre observed the influence of landscapes like those found in the work of François Boucher (1703–1770), with Bracquemond achieving, according to Silvestre, "very harmonious effects in which there are tapestry backgrounds that seem to shine from the light of an apotheosis."

Provenance
French art critic Gustave Geffroy originally bought the painting and gave it to the city of Paris. The painting was displayed at the Palais du Luxembourg until the gallery closed. It was then displayed from 1929–2019 at the Musée des Beaux-arts de Cambrai.  The painting underwent restoration in the 1980s. The Musée d'Orsay acquired the painting in 2019.

Studies and other work

Notes

References
 Becker, Jane R. (2017). "Marie Bracquemond, Impressionist Innovator: Escaping the Fury". In Laurence Madeline (ed.) Women Artists in Paris, 1850-1900. Yale University Press. pp. 55-68. .
 Bouillon, Jean-Paul. Kane, Elizabeth (1984-1985). "Marie Bracquemond." Woman's Art Journal. 5(2): 21-27.
 Bouillon, Jean-Paul (2008). "Marie Bracquemond: The Lady with the Parasol".  In Pfeiffer, Ingrid; Hollein, Max, eds. Women Impressionists. Hatje Cantz. pp. 232-279. 
 Garb, Tamar (1987)[1986]. Women Impressionists. Rizzoli. .  
 Kagawa, Kyoko (2021). "Marie Bracquemond's On the Terrace at Sevres: An Impressionist Painter's Point of Departure". Ishibashi Foundation Bulletin.  Artizon Museum. 2: 119-123.
 Kendall, Richard (2017). "Women Artists and Impressionism". In Laurence Madeline (ed.) Women Artists in Paris, 1850-1900. Yale University Press. pp. 41-54. .
 Moffett, Charles S. (1986).The New Painting: Impressionism 1874-1886. Phaidon. pp. 293-309, 316. .

External links
 Description at the Musée d'Orsay.

Paintings by Marie Bracquemond
1880 paintings